Marino (Marin) is a rural locality (a village) in Neftekamsk, Bashkortostan, Russia. The population was 471 as of 2010. There are 15 streets.

Geography 
Marino is located 2 km south of Neftekamsk. Neftekamsk is the nearest rural locality.

References 

Rural localities in Neftekamsk urban okrug